Acrylic may refer to:

Chemicals and materials

 Acrylic acid, the simplest acrylic compound
 Acrylate polymer, a group of polymers (plastics) noted for transparency and elasticity
 Acrylic resin, a group of related thermoplastic or thermosetting plastic substances
 Acrylic fiber, a synthetic fiber of polyacrylonitrile
 Acrylic paint, fast-drying paint containing pigment suspension in acrylic polymer emulsion
 Poly(methyl methacrylate), also known as acrylic glass or Plexiglass, a transparent thermoplastic

Other uses
 "Acrylic" (song), by English band The Courteeners

See also